James J. Griffin (born 1949) is an author of traditional western and Texas Ranger novels. Some of his series include the Jim Blawcyzk Texas Ranger stories, Cody Havlicek novels, the A Ranger Named Rowdy series. and the Lone Star Ranger series of Young Adult western novels. He is also a contributor to the Western Fictioneers' collaborative series, Wolf Creek. He is an enthusiast and former collector of Texas Rangers historical artefacts, and has contributed much material to the Waco Texas Ranger Hall of Fame and Museum.

Griffin was educated at Notre Dame High School in West Haven, Connecticut, from where he progressed to the nearby Southern Connecticut State University.

External links
official website

1949 births
Living people
American Western (genre) novelists
American male novelists
20th-century American novelists
21st-century American novelists
Novelists from Connecticut
Southern Connecticut State University alumni
20th-century American male writers
21st-century American male writers
Fellows of the American Physical Society